The 1979 Commonwealth Heads of Government Meeting was the fifth Meeting of the Heads of Government of the Commonwealth of Nations. 39 countries attended the meeting. It was held in Lusaka, Zambia, between 1 August 1979 and 7 August 1979, and was hosted by that country's President, Kenneth Kaunda.

Issues discussed at the conference included the situation in Rhodesia, the armed conflicts in Indo-China, the global growth of the refugee problem, the situation in Cyprus and Southern Africa. Sir Shridath Ramphal was reappointed as Commonwealth Secretary-General during the meeting. The Lusaka Declaration of the Commonwealth on Racism and Racial Prejudice was issued at the end of the CHOGM, including a special declaration condemning apartheid.

References

1979
Diplomatic conferences in Zambia
Zambia and the Commonwealth of Nations
20th century in Lusaka
1979 conferences
1979 in international relations
1979 in Zambia
20th-century diplomatic conferences
August 1979 events in Africa